Herman's Hermits on Tour (also called Their Second Album! Herman's Hermits on Tour) is the second album released in the US and Canada by MGM Records for the band Herman's Hermits. It was released in 1965. The cover drawing was by Jim Spanfeller and the design was credited to Michael Malatak.

Track listing

Side 1
 "Can't You Hear My Heartbeat" (John Carter, Ken Lewis) – 2:15
 "I'm Henry VIII, I Am" (Fred Murray, R. P. Weston) – 1:49
 "The End of the World" (Arthur Kent, Sylvia Dee) – 2:57
 "For Your Love" (Graham Gouldman) – 2:21
 "(I Gotta) Dream On" (Gary Gordon) – 2:04
 "Don't Try to Hurt Me" (Keith Hopwood) – 2:04

Side 2
 "Silhouettes" (Bob Crewe, Frank Slay) – 1:57
 "Heartbeat" (Bob Montgomery, Norman Petty) – 2:45
 "I'll Never Dance Again" (Barry Mann, Mike Anthony) – 3:00
 "Tell Me Baby" (Hopwood, Derek Leckenby) – 2:12
 "Traveling Light" (Sid Tepper, Roy C. Bennett) – 2:31

Personnel

Herman's Hermits
 Peter Noone – vocals
 Derek Leckenby – lead guitar
 Keith Hopwood – rhythm guitar
 Karl Green – bass
 Barry Whitwam – drums

Technical
 Mickie Most – producer
 Val Valentin – engineer
 Michael Malatak – design
 Jim Spanfeller – cover drawing

References

1965 albums
Herman's Hermits albums
Albums produced by Mickie Most
MGM Records albums